The Ciane (Sicilian: Ciani) is a short river in southern Sicily, Italy.

The name, deriving from the Greek cyanos ("azure"), is connected to the myth of Anapos and the nymph Cyane. On its banks are present spontaneous grows of papyrus (Cyperus papyrus), probably sent to Hiero II of Syracuse by the Egyptian ruler Ptolemy II Philadelphus. The area is now protected as part of the Natural Preserve of Fiume Ciane and Saline di Siracusa, created in 1984.

References
Guide of Sicily 

Rivers of Italy
Rivers of Sicily
Rivers of the Province of Syracuse
Drainage basins of the Ionian Sea